Microport may refer to:
MicroPort, a manufacturer of medical devices
Microport Systems (1985–2002), a software developer of Unix ports